Oetker is a surname. Notable people with the surname include:

August Oetker (1862–1918), German inventor, food scientist, and businessman
Dr. Oetker, company founded by August Oetker
Richard Oetker (born 1951), German billionaire heir and businessman, son of Rudolf
Rudolf August Oetker (1916–2007), German entrepreneur and Nazi